Arailym Abdikhamit (born 3 March 1999) is a Kazakhstani handball player for Kazygurt Handball and the Kazakhstani national team.

She competed at the 2015 World Women's Handball Championship in Denmark.

References

1999 births
Living people
Kazakhstani female handball players
Place of birth missing (living people)
Handball players at the 2018 Asian Games
Asian Games competitors for Kazakhstan
21st-century Kazakhstani women